Penarth is a town in the Vale of Glamorgan, Wales.

Penarth may also refer to:
 Penarth, Cardiganshire, a former hundred of Cardiganshire, Wales, UK
 Penarth, Delaware, an unincorporated community in New Castle County, Delaware, U.S.
 Penarth (Newtown and Llanllwchaiarn), a house in Powys, Wales
 Penarth Group, a Rhaetian age (Triassic) lithostratigraphic group
 Penarth RFC, a Welsh rugby union club